Longnecker is a surname of Swiss German origin. It is an alternate spelling of Langenecker,  a habitational name for a person from any of several places called Langeneck, a name derived from Old High German lang which means "long", and egga, which means "corner."

There are many spelling variations of Longnecker, the most common being Longenecker, Longaker, Longenencker, Langnecker, Longacker, and Langenecker.

As a surname, Longnecker may refer to:

People
Henry Clay Longnecker, member of the U.S. House of Representatives

Fictional characters
Mervin Longnecker, chief petty officer in Let's Go Navy!
Longnecker, character in Listen to Me
Longnecker, character in No Deposit, No Return
Miss Longnecker, character in O. Henry's The Skylight Room

References